Cella Monte is a comune (town) in the Province of Alessandria in the Italian region of Piedmont, located about  east of Turin and about  northwest of Alessandria. It has roughly 509 residents.

Cella Monte borders the following municipalities: Frassinello Monferrato, Ottiglio, Ozzano Monferrato, Rosignano Monferrato, and Sala Monferrato.

Name  
There are two different theories about the origin of the name: one is about wine cellars and the other one about small monasteries.
According to the first one the name may derive from the wine cellars that were dug into the sandstone, which is really common in this geographical area. These cellars, called infernot, even though are not being used anymore they still exist nowadays and can be visited. 
The other theory is about the small monasteries which in Italian are called Celle.

The name appeared for the first time in a document signed by the Emperor Arrigo V in 1116.

History

References

https://borghipiubelliditalia.it/borgo/cella-monte/

Cities and towns in Piedmont